The University of South-Eastern Norway, commonly known as USN, is a Norwegian state university. It has campuses in Bø in Telemark, Porsgrunn, Notodden, Rauland, Drammen, Hønefoss, Kongsberg and Horten. USN is a continuation of the three former university colleges, Telemark University College, Buskerud University College and Vestfold University College, which merged between 2014 and 2016 to form the University College of South-Eastern Norway. The institution was granted the status of a full university by the King-in-Council on 4 May 2018. It has 1,360 employees and 17,152 students.

USN has 88 undergraduate programs, 44 master's programs and 8 PhD programs. Measured in the number of students, USN is among the largest in higher education in Norway. The university is exclusively offering several courses in Norway, such as optician study in Kongsberg and writer's study in Bø.

History 
Buskerud University College and Vestfold University College merged to Buskerud and Vestfold University College in 2014. On 4 June 2015, the boards on University College in Buskerud and Vestfold approved a proposal along with Telemark University College to ask the government to merge the educational institutions. The Storting's consideration of Report to the Storting no. 18 (2014–2015) Konsentrasjon for kvalitet – strukturreform i universitets- og høyskolesektoren found place on 11 June. The institutions were formally merged on 19 June through Royal Decree with effect from 1 January 2016. 

The merger decision from the respective directors at Buskerud and Vestfold University College and Telemark University College, asked that the name of the merged school should be University College of South-Eastern Norway with merger date 1 January 2016. It was also specified in the board decision that the purpose of the merge was to become a university. An application to be granted status as a university was sent for assessment by NOKUT in 2017, and NOKUT issued its recommendation that the institution meet the criteria for university status in April 2018. The institution was granted status as a university under the name University of South-Eastern Norway in King-in-Council on 4 May 2018 and is usually referred to by the abbreviation USN.

Organization

Management 
The rectorate at USN consists of rector Petter Aasen, vice-rector Nils Kristian Bogen and vice-rectors Ingvild Marheim Larsen and Heidi Kristin Ormstad. The chairman of the board is Professor Tore Isaksen.

In addition to the rectorate, USN's management team consists of the four deans, six directors and a chief of staff.

Faculties and departments 
From 1 January 2017, the former 8 faculties at Telemark University College, Buskerud University College and Vestfold University College became 4 faculties and the former 36 departments became 20.

Faculty of Health and Social Sciences 
The Faculty of Health and Social Sciences offers studies in nursing, social care, child welfare, radiography, lighting design and optometry. USN is also the only Norwegian educational institution that offers optician education. The faculty is led as of 16 August 2018 by Dean Heidi Kapstad and Deputy Dean Pia Cecilie Bing-Jonsson. The faculty director is Kjetil Horgmo.

The faculty has the following departments:

 Department of Nursing and Health Sciences. Conducts the third largest bachelor's program in nursing in Norway on three campuses Porsgrunn, Vestfold and Drammen) The department also offers master's programs (clinical health work, advanced clinical nursing, midwife, intensive care, anesthesia) and further educations as a nurse and geriatric assessment competence.
 Department of Health, Social Affairs and Welfare.
 Department of Optometry, Radiography and Lighting Design.

In addition to the professional studies, the faculty offers a number of master's programs, and a PhD program in person-oriented health work.

Faculty of Humanities, Sports and Educational Sciences 
The Faculty of Humanities, Sports and Educational Sciences offers both studies in major professional educations such as primary school teachers and kindergarten teachers and studies in disciplinary traditions such as art, culture, folk music and sports. As of 16 August 2018, the faculty is headed by Dean Arild Hovland, Deputy Dean for the primary school teacher education and PPU, Anne Fængsrud, and Deputy Dean for the kindergarten teacher education, Hege Hansson. The faculty director is Bent Kristiansen.

The faculty has the following departments:

 Department of Mathematics and Science.     
 Department of Language and Literature.     
 Department of Culture, Religion and Social Sciences.     
 Department of Outdoor Life, Sports and Physical Education.     
 Department of Aesthetic Sciences.     
 Department of Traditional Art and Folk Music.     
 Department of Education.

Faculty of Technology, Science and Maritime Studies 
The Faculty of Technology, Science and Maritime Studies has the following departments:

 Department of Electrical Engineering, IT and Cybernetics. Offers education with a focus on automation, electric power technology, digitization, welfare technology, renewable energy and autonomy in the process industry.
 Department of Maritime Operations. The department offers education in shipping and logistics, nautical science, marine engineering, maritime management and nautical operations.
 Department of Microsystems. Offers bachelor's degree in engineering in computer engineering, electrical automation and robotics, applied micro- and nanotechnology, SMART product design, master in micro- and nanosystem technology and Joint International Master in Smart Systems Integration as well as PhD program in applied micro- and nanosystems.
 Department of Nature, Health and Environment. Has bachelor's studies with specialization in nature management or pollution and master's studies in nature, health and the environment.
 Department of Process, Energy and Environmental Technology. Offers bachelor in building design, machine design, plan and infrastructure, clean energy and process technology, master in process technology and in energy and environmental technology as well as PhD in process, energy and automation engineering.
 Department of Science and Industrial Systems. Has a bachelor's degree in computer engineering, electrical engineering, product development and mechanical engineering, and various master's degrees in Systems Engineering and the associate professor education in science.

USN Handelshøyskolen 
USN Handelshøyskolen (USN Business School) offers bachelor's and master's programs as well as a PhD program in Marketing Management. In addition, several year studies and further education studies are offered.

 Department of Economics and IT. Offers a bachelor's degree in economics and management, innovation and entrepreneurship, real estate, international marketing and tourism as well as IT and information systems. Also offers one-year study in IT and information systems, information processing, geographical information systems and business economics.
 Department of Industrial Economics, Strategy and Political Science
 Department of Economics, Marketing and Law. Offers a bachelor's degree in visual communication, economics and management as well as political science. Offers master's in economics and management, and part-time study in Executive Master of Management, economics and management as well as social sciences.
 Department of Economics, History and Social Sciences. Has as stated core task to conduct teaching and research in economics, entrepreneurship, innovation, management, IT, history and sociology. In addition to year and bachelor's studies within this, the department also offers master's studies in innovation and management, associate professor education in history and social sciences.

Notable alumni 

The University of South-Eastern Norway is a continuation of three former university colleges and one of the newest full universities in Norway, hence its academics and alumni include notable people from before the merging.

 Sigve Brekke – President and CEO of Telenor Group
 Eli Blakstad – Politician for the Centre Party
 Halvor Kleppen – Media personality, theme park owner and writer
 Nicolai Houm – Novelist
 Sindre Fossum Beyer – Politician for the Labour Party
 Trude Marstein – Author

External cooperation 
USN collaborates with the region's business community on research, development and innovation projects, and employs people from the business community in assistantships at the institution in connection with such projects. These people are employed in a 20 percent position at USN, and work on projects that focus on practically useful issues for companies. As of 2018, USN has employed people from FMC Technologies, GE Vingmed Ultrasound, Semcon Devotek, Skagerak Energi, Conexus AS, TechnipFMC, Sopra Steria and Kongsberg Group.

Gallery

References

External links
 University of South-Eastern Norway

 
Universities and colleges in Norway
Education in Vestfold og Telemark
Education in Viken (county)
Bø, Telemark
Kongsberg
Educational institutions established in 2016
2016 establishments in Norway
Universities and colleges formed by merger in Norway